Belitsa may refer to:

 In Bulgaria (written in Cyrillic as Белица):
 Belitsa - a town in the Belitsa municipality, Blagoevgrad province
 Belitsa Municipality - a municipality in the Blagoevgrad province
 Belitsa, Gabrovo Province - a village in the Tryavna municipality, Gabrovo province
 Belitsa, Haskovo Province - a village in the Lyubimets municipality, Haskovo province
 Belitsa, Plovdiv Province - a village in the Laki municipality, Plovdiv province
 Belitsa, Silistra Province - a village in the Tutrakan municipality, Silistra province
 Belitsa, Sofia Province - a village in the Ihtiman municipality, Sofia province

See also
Belica (disambiguation)